Mimouna (Berber: Mimuna, ⵎⵉⵎⵓⵏⴰ) is a traditional Maghrebi Jewish celebration dinner, that currently takes place in Morocco, Israel, France, Canada, and other places around the world where Jews of Maghrebi heritage live. It is held the day after Passover, marking the return to eating hametz (leavened bread, etc.), which is forbidden throughout the week of Passover.

History
Though the practice only began to be recorded in the middle of the 18th century, its derivation and etymology are ancient. Possible derivations for the name Mimouna are: "Rabbi Maimon ben Yosef" (father of the Rambam Maimonides). Thus, the Mimouna might mark the date of his birth or death; the Hebrew word "emuna" (meaning "faith") or "ma’amin" (meaning "I believe"); the Arabic word for "wealth" or "good luck" as on this day, according to midrash, the gold and jewelry of the drowned Egyptians washed up on the shore of the Red Sea and enriched the Israelites. Mimouna is associated with "faith" and "belief" in immediate prosperity, as seen in its customs of matchmaking, and well-wishes for successful childbearing; manna, which was the food God provided following the Exodus, and during the subsequent wandering in the desert. The name of a Berber goddess is also a possible etymology.

Mimouna celebrates belief in both the past Jewish redemption from the Egyptians and the future Messianic redemption: "In Nisan (the month in which Passover falls), the Jews were redeemed and in Nisan they will be redeemed in the future. When Passover ends and the Jews are still not redeemed, the Moroccan Jews do not lose their faith; as the Sages said: 'Even if he tarries, I will expect him every day.'"

It was at the crossing of the Reed Sea on the final day of Passover that the entire nation witnessed the awesome power and might of God which was an experience that strengthened their faith. "And Israel saw the great work which the LORD did upon the Egyptians, and the people feared the LORD; and they believed in the LORD, and in His servant Moses." –

Holiday customs

In Morocco, on the afternoon of the last day of Passover, Jewish families prepare flour, honey, milk, and butter to be used to prepare post-Passover chametz celebration dinners. Historically, Jewish congregations would walk to an orchard in order to recite Birkat Ha'Ilanot, and following the conclusion of Passover, would recite passages from the Book of Proverbs and the Mishna.

The celebration begins after nightfall on the last day of Passover. In many communities, non-Jewish neighbors sell chametz back to Jewish families as a beginning of the celebration. Moroccan and Algerian Jews throw open their homes to visitors, after setting out a lavish spread of  traditional holiday cakes and sweetmeats. One of the holiday favorites is mofletta. The table is also laid with various symbols of luck and fertility, with an emphasis on the number "5," such as five pieces of gold jewelry or five beans arranged on a leaf of pastry. The repetition of the number five references the five-fingered hamsa amulet common in both Jewish and Muslim North African and Middle Eastern communities from pre-modern times. Typically all those in attendance at a Mimouna celebration are sprinkled with a mint sprig or other green dipped in milk, symbolizing good fortune and new beginnings.

Early in the day of the Mimouna, families go to the sea, splash water on their face, and walk barefoot in the water, to replay the scene of the miraculous crossing of the Reed Sea, which is held to have taken place on the last day of Passover.

In Israel, the Mimouna has become a popular annual happening featuring outdoor parties, picnics, BBQs, and politics: A central celebration in Jerusalem’s Sacher Park draws about 100,000 people, usually including the president and prime minister. Israeli law now requires employers to agree to grant an employee unpaid leave for Mimouna if asked. One source estimated that in 2012 nearly two million people in Israel participated in Mimouna festivities.

See also

Culture of Morocco
Culture of Israel
Moroccan Jews in Israel
Jewish holidays

References

External links
History of the Moroccan Jews  
Stichting Maimon 
Kordova, Shoshana. "Word of the Day / Mimouna." Haaretz. April 2, 2013.
 

Jews and Judaism in Algeria
Jews and Judaism in Morocco
Minor Jewish holidays
Nisan observances
Passover
Public holidays in Israel
Arabic words and phrases
Hebrew names of Jewish holy days